Foreign Body is a collaborative album of Tiny Vipers and Grouper under their common moniker Mirrorring. It was released on March 19, 2012 on Kranky.

Track listing

References 

2012 albums
Ambient albums by American artists
Kranky albums